Stielers Handatlas (after Adolf Stieler, 1775–1836), formally titled Hand-Atlas über alle Theile der Erde und über das Weltgebäude (Handy atlas of all parts of the world and of the universe), was the leading German world atlas of the last three decades of the 19th and the first half of the 20th century. Published by Justus Perthes of Gotha (established 1785 and still existing there) it went through ten editions from 1816 to 1945. As with many 19th century publications, an edition was issued in parts; for example, the eighth edition was issued in 32 monthly parts.

Editions 
The earliest edition, by Stieler and Christian Gottlieb Reichard, was published as separate plates from 1817 to 1823. There were 47 maps, though the intention had been to publish 50. After Stieler's death Friedrich von Stülpnagel (1786–1865) edited the first (1834-1845) edition, and the second (1845–47) with 107 maps. Petermann contributed to the third (1854–62) edition containing 83 maps, the fourth (1864–67) and the fifth (1868–74), each with 84 maps.

However, it was not until the sixth edition (1871–75, 90 maps), edited by August Petermann (1822–78), Hermann Berghaus (1828–1890) and Carl Vogel (1828–1897), that the work reached the high scientific level and the unsurpassed relief Stieler's Atlas is famous for. A seventh edition was issued 1879-82; an eighth 1888-91 (both 95 maps) under the direction of Hermann Berghaus, Vogel and Hermann Habenicht (1844–1917). Although the printing industry had already changed to lithography for some time, some maps in Stieler's Atlas were still reproduced by copper-plate printing on hand presses with hand colouring into the 1890s.

The ninth edition (1901–05), edited by Habenicht, with one hundred maps, over double the number of the initial edition, was the first one printed on cylinder machines by means of lithography, which halved the price and made the Stieler accessible to a broad public. 16 maps hereof were exclusively translated to English, transferred to Imperial units and became part the 11th edition of the Encyclopædia Britannica (1910–1911). Hermann Haack (1872–1966) edited the tenth (centenary) edition (1920–25, 108 maps), with an index to 320,000 entries being the most comprehensive world atlas of modern times.

English versions of the ninth and tenth editions appeared as Stieler's Atlas of Modern Geography, and editions with similar titles were also issued in French, Italian and Spanish. An international edition (1934–1940) remained with 84 of the 114 maps planned incomplete due to wartime circumstances. The work was engraved on 432 copper plates which have been preserved.

References 

Espenhorst, E; Petermann's Planet (Schwerte, 2003).
Köhler, F; Gothaer Wege in Geographie und Kartographie (Gotha, 1987)
Suchy, G; Gothaer Geographen und Kartographen (Gotha, 1985)

External links
 Priliminary ed.: Hand-Atlas über alle Theile der Erde nach dem neuesten Zustande und über das Weltgebäude, 1816–1833, 50-75 maps (Adolf Stieler & Heinrich Berghaus)
 1st ed.: Stieler's Hand-Atlas über alle Theile der Erde und über das Weltgebäude, 1834–1845, 75-83 maps (Adolf Stieler & Friedrich von Stülpnagel)
 2nd ed.: Stieler's Hand-Atlas über alle Theile der Erde und über das Weltgebäude, 1846–1852, 83 maps (Friedrich von Stülpnagel)
 3rd ed.: Stieler's Hand-Atlas über alle Theile der Erde und über das Weltgebäude, 1853–1862, 83-84 maps (Friedrich von Stülpnagel)
 4th ed.: Stieler's Hand-Atlas über alle Theile der Erde und über das Weltgebäude, 1863–1867, 84 maps (August Petermann)
 5th ed.: Hand-Atlas über alle Theile der Erde und über das Weltgebäude, 1868–1874, 84 maps (August Petermann)
 6th ed.: Hand-Atlas über alle Theile der Erde und über das Weltgebäude, 1875–1881, 90 maps (Hermann Berghaus & Carl Vogel)
 7th ed.: Adolf Stieler's Hand Atlas über alle Theile der Erde und über das Weltgebäude, 1882–1889, 95 maps (Hermann Berghaus & Carl Vogel)
 8th. Ed.: Adolf Stieler's Hand Atlas über alle Theile der Erde und über das Weltgebäude, 1890–1902, 95 maps(Alexander Supan)
 9th ed.: Stielers Hand-Atlas, 1905–1924, 100 maps (Hermann Haack)
 10th ed.: Stielers Hand-Atlas, 1925–1945, 108 maps (Hermann Haack)
 International ed.: Stieler grand atlas de géographie moderne, 1934–1940, 84 maps (Hermann Haack)
DavidRumsey.com The 1875 6th Edition Handatlas, and many other maps and atlases, are viewable online
maproom.org 1891 8th Edition Handatlas
handatlas.de Web archive of the great German Hand-Atlases. Stielers of all decades online.

Sources 
Justus Perthes (publishing company)

Atlases